Chaetorellia jaceae is a species of tephritid or fruit flies in the genus Chaetorellia of the family Tephritidae.

Distribution
Europe, South to France, Italy, Hungary, Ukraine & Caucasus.

References

Tephritinae
Insects described in 1830
Diptera of Europe